Everything Is Green is the first album by indie rock band The Essex Green.  It was recorded at Studio 45 in Hartford, CT and Marlborough Farms in Brooklyn and released in 1999 by Kindercore Records.

Track listing
"Primrose"
"The Playground"
"Mrs. Bean"
"Tinker"
"Everything Is Green"
"Sixties"
"Saturday"
"Grass"
"Big Green Tree"
"Carballo"

References

The Essex Green albums
1999 albums